Kadapa is a city in the Rayalseema region of the south-central part of Andhra Pradesh, India.

Kadapa may refer to:

 Kadapa (Lok Sabha constituency)
 Kadapa (Assembly constituency)
 Kadapa Airport
 Kadapa revenue division
 Kadapa district
 Kadapa railway station